The men's handball tournament at the 2020 Summer Olympics was the 14th edition of the handball event for men at the Summer Olympic Games. It was held from 24 July to 7 August 2021. All games were played at the Yoyogi National Gymnasium in Tokyo, Japan.

It was originally scheduled to be held in 2020, but on 24 March 2020, the Olympics were postponed to 2021 due to the COVID-19 pandemic. Because of this pandemic, the games were played behind closed doors.

The final was a rematch of the previous between Denmark and France. After Denmark won 28–26 in the 2016 final, France got the upper hand with a 25–23 win this time. Spain won the bronze medal match against Egypt.

This meant that France won both gold medals as the first team since 1984.

The medals for the competition were presented by Jean-Christophe Rolland, France; IOC Member, and the medalists' bouquets were presented by Joël Delplanque, France; IHF 1st Vice-President.

Schedule

Qualification

Draw
The draw was held on 1 April 2021.

Seeding
The seeding was revealed on 14 March 2021.

Roster

Referees
The referee pairs were announced on 21 April 2021.

Group stage
All times are local (UTC+9).

Group A

Group B

Knockout stage

Bracket

Quarterfinals

Semifinals

Bronze medal game

Gold medal game

Ranking and statistics

Final ranking

All Star Team
The all-star team was announced on 7 August 2021.

Top goalscorers

Source: IHF

With his fourth goal against Portugal Mikkel Hansen became the Olympic Games topscorer of all time with 128 goals.

Top goalkeepers

Source: IHF

References

Men's tournament
Men's events at the 2020 Summer Olympics